Jurki may refer to the following places:
Jurki, Lublin Voivodeship (east Poland)
Jurki, Masovian Voivodeship (east-central Poland)
Jurki, Podlaskie Voivodeship (north-east Poland)
Jurki, Pomeranian Voivodeship (north Poland)
Jurki, Olecko County in Warmian-Masurian Voivodeship (north Poland)
Jurki, Ostróda County in Warmian-Masurian Voivodeship (north Poland)